KLOZ is a radio station (92.7 FM) licensed to Eldon, Missouri, United States.

KLOZ may also refer to:
 London-Corbin Airport's ICAO code

People with the surname
František Kloz, Czech football player

See also
Klotz (surname)